This is a list of lists of Powerpuff Girls episodes:
 List of The Powerpuff Girls episodes
 List of Powerpuff Girls Z episodes
 List of The Powerpuff Girls (2016 TV series) episodes

See also
 List of Powerpuff Girls characters

Episodes